Tunde Ogungbesan (born 5 May 1964) is a Diversity and inclusion and Talent Management executive and a former Director of Diversity, Inclusion and Leadership Succession at the BBC.

Early life and education 
Ogungbesan was born in London, UK. He grew up in Dagenham, Banbury and London and Lagos, Nigeria. He attended Igbobi College in Lagos and graduated  from University of Lagos with a BSc (Hons) Zoology. He received an MBA at Henley Business School.

Career 
Ogungbesan started his career in the UK Civil Service and later worked for Coopers & Lybrand and the NatWest Group. In 2000, he joined Royal Dutch Shell based in London. In 2015, he was appointed as a Director at the BBC in the role of Head of Diversity, Inclusion and Leadership Succession. He is first black man to lead the Diversity and inclusion agenda at the BBC. He led the BBC's diversity and inclusion strategy for the workforce, TV, radio and digital services, on-screen, off-screen, in front of the camera, behind the camera and for onscreen portrayal and for building an inclusive culture with both staff and audiences. Ogungbesan was responsible for the BBC 2016-2020 Diversity and Inclusion strategy and the publication of landmark reports on race, gender, social inclusion, sexual orientation and disability. The reports resulted in 128 recommendations. He was also responsible for the introduction of Diversity Commissioning Code of Practice which puts diversity at the heart of the BBC's TV and Radio diversity commissioning processes and standardising the approach across all output for the first time. Before leaving BBC in 2019, Ogungbesan was responsible for the restructure of the BBC diversity organisation, splitting it into two arms: creative diversity and workforce diversity. Tunde is currently an executive talent development adviser at Saudi Aramco in Saudi Arabia.

Awards and honours 

 In 2019 Tunde was listed in the 100 most influential Black people in the UK
 At the  2019 UK HR Excellence Awards, Ogungbesan's BBC team won the Diversity and Inclusion award.

References 

Living people
1964 births
Businesspeople from London
BBC executives
University of Lagos alumni
Alumni of Henley Management College
Coopers and Lybrand people
NatWest Group people
Shell plc people
Saudi Aramco people
Black British businesspeople
Diversity management people
Igbobi College alumni